Graphium is a genus of mostly tropical swallowtail butterflies commonly known as swordtails, kite swallowtails, or ladies. Native to Eurasia, Africa, and Oceania, the genus is represented by over 100 species. Their colouration is as variable as the habitats they frequent; from rainforest to savannah. Some possess tails which may be long and swordlike, while others lack any hindwing extensions. Graphium species are often sighted at mud puddles.

The more colourful species are popular with collectors and are commonly seen mounted in frames for sale. Well-known species include the tailed jay (Graphium agamemnon), common bluebottle (G. sarpedon), and the purple-spotted swallowtail (G. weiskei). One species, G. idaeoides, is notable for being a perfect mimic of the danainid Idea leuconoe.

Larvae feed variously on Annonaceae (most commonly), Magnoliaceae (commonly), Lauraceae (commonly), Rutaceae, Dioscoreaceae, Bombacaceae, Piperaceae, Anacardiaceae, Apocynaceae, Malpighiaceae, Hernandiaceae, Guttiferae, Monimiaceae, Pandanaceae, Winteraceae, and Euphorbiaceae.

Species

Listed alphabetically:

subgenus: Idaides
species group: codrus
 Graphium anthedon (C. Felder & R. Felder, 1864) – Wallacea bluebottle
 Graphium cloanthus (Westwood, 1841) – glassy bluebottle
 Graphium codrus (Cramer, [1777]) – eastern olive triangle
 Graphium empedocles (Fabricius, 1787), originally Papilio empedocles Fabricius, 1787; Mantissa Insectorum 2: 10, no. 94 = homonym of Papilio empedocles Cramer, 1779; replaced by empedovana Corbet, 1941.
 Graphium empedovana (Corbet, 1941)
 Graphium gelon (Boisduval, 1859)
 Graphium macleayanus (Leach, 1814) – Macleay's swallowtail
 Graphium mendana (Godman & Salvin, 1888)
 Graphium monticolus (Fruhstorfer, 1896) – Sulawesi blue triangle
 ?Graphium protensor (Gistel,1857) Papilio protensor Gistel, J.,1857 Achthundert und zwanzig neue oder unbeschriebene wirbellose Theire charakterisirt von Doctor Johannes Gistel Vacuna 2(2):513-606. synonym of Graphium sarpedon
 Graphium sarpedon (Linnaeus, 1758) – common bluebottle or blue triangle
 Graphium stresemanni (Rothschild, 1916)
 Graphium weiskei (Ribbe, 1900) – purple spotted swallowtail

species group: eurypylus
 Graphium agamemnon (Linnaeus, 1758) – tailed jay or green-spotted triangle
 Graphium arycles (Boisduval, 1836) – spotted jay
 Graphium bathycles (Zinken, 1831)
 Graphium chironides (Honrath, 1884) – veined jay
 Graphium doson (C. Felder & R. Felder, 1864) – common jay
 Graphium eurypylus (Linnaeus, 1758) – great jay or pale green triangle
 Graphium evemon (Boisduval, 1836) – lesser jay
 Graphium leechi (Rothschild, 1895)
 Graphium macfarlanei (Butler, 1877) – green triangle butterfly or green triangle
 Graphium meeki (Rothschild & Jordan, 1901) – Meek's graphium
 Graphium meyeri (Hopffer, 1874)
 Graphium procles (Grose-Smith, 1887)

species group: wallacei
 Graphium browni (Godman & Salvin, 1879)
 Graphium hicetaon (Mathew, 1886)
 Graphium sandawanum Yamamoto, 1977 – Apo swallowtail
 Graphium wallacei (Hewitson, 1858)

subgenus: Arisbe Hübner, [1819]
species group: antheus
 Graphium antheus (Cramer, [1779]) – large striped swordtail
 Graphium evombar (Boisduval, 1836)

species group: policenes
 Graphium biokoensis Gauthier, 1984 – Gauthier's striped swordtail
 Graphium colonna (Ward, 1873) – black swordtail or mamba swordtail
 Graphium gudenusi (Rebel, 1911)
 Graphium illyris (Hewitson, 1872) - cream-banded swordtail
 Graphium junodi (Trimen, 1893) – Junod's swordtail
 Graphium kirbyi (Hewitson, 1872) – Kirby's swordtail
 Graphium liponesco (Suffert, 1904)
 Graphium policenes (Cramer, [1775]) – small striped swordtail or common swordtail
 Graphium policenoides (Holland, 1892)
 Graphium polistratus (Grose-Smith, 1889) – dancing swordtail
 Graphium porthaon (Hewitson, 1865) – coastal swordtail, cream-striped swordtail, or dark swordtail

species group: angolanus
 Graphium angolanus (Goeze, 1779) – Angola white lady (swordtail)
 Graphium endochus (Boisduval, 1836)
 Graphium morania (Angas, 1849) – white lady (swallowtail) or small white-lady swordtail
 Graphium ridleyanus (White, 1843) - acraea swordtail
 Graphium schaffgotschi (Niepelt, 1927) – Schaffgotsch's swordtail
 Graphium taboranus (Oberthür, 1886)

species group: leonidas
 Graphium cyrnus (Boisduval, 1836)
 Graphium leonidas (Fabricius, 1793) – veined swordtail, veined swallowtail, or common graphium
 Graphium levassori Oberthür, 1890

species group: tynderaeus
 Graphium tynderaeus (Fabricius, 1793) – electric green swordtail or green-spotted swallowtail
 Graphium latreillianus (Godart, 1819) – coppery swordtail

species group: philonoe
 Graphium philonoe (Ward, 1873) – eastern white-lady swordtail, eastern graphium, white-dappled swallowtail

species group: adamastor
 Graphium abri Smith & Vane-Wright, 2001
 Graphium adamastor (Boisduval, 1836) – Boisduval's white-lady
 Graphium agamedes (Westwood, 1842) – Westwood's white-lady or glassy graphium
 Graphium almansor (Honrath, 1884) – Almansor white-lady swordtail or Honrath's white-lady
 Graphium auriger (Butler, 1876)
 Graphium aurivilliusi (Seeldrayers, 1896)
 Graphium fulleri (Grose-Smith, 1883)
 Graphium hachei (Dewitz, 1881)
 Graphium kigoma Carcasson, 1964
 Graphium olbrechtsi Berger, 1950
 Graphium poggianus (Honrath, 1884)
 Graphium rileyi Berger, 1950 - Riley's graphium
 Graphium schubotzi (Schultze, 1913)
 Graphium simoni (Aurivillius, 1899)
 Graphium ucalegon (Hewitson, 1865) – creamy graphium
 Graphium ucalegonides (Staudinger, 1884)

subgenus: Pathysa 
species group: antiphates
 Graphium agetes (Westwood, 1841) – fourbar swordtail
 Graphium androcles (Boisduval, 1836) – lion swordtail, giant swordtail
 Graphium antiphates (Cramer, [1775]) – fivebar swordtail
 Graphium aristeus (Stoll, [1780]) – chain swordtail
 Graphium decolor (Staudinger, 1888)
 Graphium dorcus (de Haan, 1840) – Tabitha's swordtail
 Graphium epaminondas (Oberthür, 1879)
 Graphium euphrates (C. Felder & R. Felder, 1862) – Euphrates swordtail
 Graphium euphratoides (Eimer, 1889)
 Graphium nomius (Esper, 1799) – spot swordtail
 Graphium rhesus (Boisduval, 1836) – monkey swordtail
 Graphium stratiotes (Grose-Smith, 1887)

subgenus: Paranticopsis Wood-Mason & de Nicéville, 1887
 Graphium delessertii (Guérin-Méneville, 1839) – Malayan zebra
 Graphium deucalion (Boisduval, 1836) – yellow zebra
 Graphium encelades (Boisduval, 1836)
 Graphium idaeoides (Hewitson, 1853)
 Graphium macareus (Godart, 1819) – lesser zebra
 Graphium megaera (Staudinger, 1888)
 Graphium megarus (Westwood, 1844) – spotted zebra
 Graphium ramaceus (Westwood, 1872)
 Graphium phidias (Oberthür, 1906)
 Graphium stratocles (C. Felder & R. Felder, 1861)
 Graphium thule (Wallace, 1865)
 Graphium xenocles (Doubleday, 1842) – great zebra

subgenus: Pazala Moore, 1888
 Graphium alebion (Gray, [1853])
 Graphium eurous (Leech, [1893]) – sixbar swordtail
 Graphium glycerion (Gray, 1831) – spectacle swordtail
 Graphium incerta Bang-Haas, 1927
 Graphium mandarinus (Oberthür, 1879) – spectacle swordtail
 Graphium mullah (Alphéraky 1897)::* Graphium tamerlana (Oberthür, 1876)
 Graphium timur (Ney, 1911) synonymised with Graphium mullah by Cotton and Racheli, T., 2007 
 Graphium wenlingae Hu, Condamine, Monastyrskii & Cotton, 2019

See also
 Protographium

References

Smith, Campbell R. and Vane-Wright R.I., 2001 A review of the Afrotropical species of the genus Graphium (Lepidoptera: Rhopalocera: Papilionidae) Bulletin of the Natural History Museum Entomology Series Volume 70:503-719 online
Miller, L. D., and Miller, J. Y. (2004). The Butterfly Handbook, pp. 20–25, 52. Barron's Educational Series, Inc.; Hauppauge, New York. 
Smart, P. (1976). The Illustrated Encyclopedia of the Butterfly World.

External links

"Distribution of Afrotropical Kite Swallowtails" (broadly subgenera Pazala and Arisbe) Natural History Museum.
"Genus Graphium". Insecta.pro.

 
Butterfly genera
Papilionidae
Taxa named by Giovanni Antonio Scopoli